Actuarial Society of Malaysia, also known as ASM was founded on 5 October 1978. ASM is the only representative body for the actuarial profession in Malaysia. Thus, it is the platform for members of the actuarial profession to raise and discuss technical and public interest issues related to the practice of the profession; to communicate such issues to relevant parties including the public, industry regulators and corporate stakeholders; to provide educational support to actuarial students and professional development to qualified actuaries; and to provide space for members of the profession to build relationships.

ASM became a Full Member Association of the International Actuarial Association on 20 October 2003.

See also
Actuary
Actuarial science
Actuarial notation

Actuarial organizations
A list of actuarial organisations worldwide could be found here: :Category:Actuarial associations

External links
 Official Site of the Actuarial Society of Malaysia

References

Actuarial associations
Professional associations based in Malaysia
Organizations established in 1978
1978 establishments in Malaysia
Finance in Malaysia
Non-profit organisations based in Malaysia